Guzmán Corujo Bríccola (born 2 August 1996) is a Uruguayan professional footballer who plays as a centre-back for MLS club Charlotte FC.

Career
Nacional signed Corujo in 2017.

Charlotte FC signed Corujo on August 30, 2021.

Career statistics

Honours
Nacional
Uruguayan Primera División: 2019, 2020
Supercopa Uruguaya: 2021

References

External links
 

1996 births
Living people
People from San José Department
Association football defenders
Uruguayan footballers
Uruguayan Primera División players
Major League Soccer players
Club Nacional de Football players
Charlotte FC players
Uruguayan expatriate footballers
Uruguayan expatriate sportspeople in the United States
Expatriate soccer players in the United States